Luis Selvin Zelaya Bran (born 1 March 1979 in Usulután, El Salvador) is a Salvadoran professional football player, who currently plays for Aspirante in the Salvadoran second division.

Club career
Zelaya has played professionally in the Primera División de Fútbol de El Salvador for Municipal Limeño, Atlético Balboa and joined Salvadoran top team Águila in 2006. He returned to Balboa 2 years later.

International career
Zelaya made his debut for El Salvador in a September 2006 friendly match against Honduras, coming on as a second half substitute for Marvin González. The game proved to be his one and only international match.

References

External links

Profile - El Gráfico 

1979 births
Living people
People from Usulután Department
Association football midfielders
Salvadoran footballers
Atlético Balboa footballers
C.D. Águila footballers
El Salvador international footballers